Frederic Duran i Jordà (Barcelona, Catalonia, Spain, 25 April 1905 – Manchester, United Kingdom, 30 March 1957) was a Spanish medical doctor, pioneer hematology and hemotherapy. He created the first transfusion service in the world in Barcelona in 1936 at the beginning of the Spanish Civil War. Previously there were blood banks, where donated blood to be transfused was stored. Dr. Duran i Jordà created a methodology that would serve to collect massive blood donations and be transfused distance, in this case the front lines of the Spanish Civil War. This method was subsequently applied in World War II.

Personal life 
Duran was born in the Barcelona district of Barceloneta, April 25, 1905, within a middle-class family originally from Martorell. His father was a merchant with concerns about the culture and sport worried that the youngest of five children, Frederic, had an education. He had originally planned an elementary education, but the child's ability impressed his teachers who persuaded his father to allow him first attend high school and then go to college. There were discrepancies between father and son regarding the final choice, Frederic was attracted by the chemical but eventually the paternal pragmatism prevailed and enrolled in medicine in 1922. He received his degree at age 23 in June 1928.

During his degree, his interest of chemistry led him to laboratory tests, and while he was an intern at the Department of Surgical Pathology Dr. Antoni Trias Pujol in the Hospital Clinic of Barcelona and began working in that area. He began in the Clinical Analysis of Gastroenterology and later became supernumerary optional clinical analysis of the City of Barcelona and directing laboratory analysis of the Instituto Frenopático Corts, a position he held until the end of the Civil War.

In February 1939, at the end of the Spanish Civil War, Duran i Jordà had to leave in exile. He was lured to London, UK by the British Red Cross (invitation to which very few people have access, and necessary migrate to the country) and like Josep Trueta became part of a numerically small but qualitatively enormous 'Catalan diaspora' in Great Britain. The British Red Cross, through Janet Vaughan, knows Duran's work and in the imminence of the 2nd World War they were willing to create a service like the one he organized in Barcelona. Then, he moved to Manchester where he worked as a Laboratory Technician at Ancoats Hospital while sorting the bureaucracy to enter the Medical Register. Once that was sorted, he devoted to pathology and became the director of the department of pathology at Booths Hall Children's Hospital, Manchester and the Monsall Hospital. He died of leukemia on March 30, 1957 at the Manchester Royal Infirmary, at 51 years of age.

Career

Precedents 

To understand the importance of the work of Duran i Jordà is necessary to place it in its historical context. The discovery of main blood groups by Karl Landsteiner (not yet the Rhesus factor) in the early twentieth century, began the scientific period of transfusion therapy, hitherto surrounded by a halo of superstition and fraud. To do it is obvious the need for human blood: the first solution is to perform the transfusion of donor arm to arm the receiver. In the early 1920s, was established in London, which subsequently Transfusion Service Blood Red Cross in Greater London would be called: a group of people who have been subjected to a physical examination, were has determined his blood group and have ruled out syphilis. Will be called when a hospital transfusion needed: the first year just received 13 petitions, but in the decade of the 30 attending more than 3 000 calls annually. And always in an absolutely altruistic.

At the same time he start working on a method to thin the blood and to allow transfusion: a Belgian researcher Albert Hustin published in April 1914 a method using sodium citrate; November 15 of the same year Dr. Luis Agote performed in Buenos Aires the first transfusion with blood anticoagulated with citrate. Later Richard Lewisohn of Mount Sinai Hospital in New York in 1915 established the proportion of better tolerated by the receiver citrate 0.2%. Despite being known citrate anticoagulation, its use is not widespread and during World War II, at most, a few hundred transfusions and always in an "almost" directly were performed: citrate donor blood was extracted and immediately transfused to the recipient.

Early attempts to preserve blood for transfusion were made in Russia. The doctor Sergei Yudin first used in 1930 in Moscow Sklifosovsky Institute, a specialized emergency hospital, blood transfusion corpse coming to create a small reservoir with citrated blood kept at 4 °C. By 1938 he had injected blood from this source 2 500 people, of which seven died and 125 experienced mild reactions such as fever and chills.

In 1937 Dr. Bernard Fantus, a doctor at Cook County Hospital in Chicago, created a service to collect blood donations in a glass jar and store citrate cold after analysis. He called Blood Conservation Laboratory, but due to its operation of depositing and removing, soon received a name quickly became popular: Blood Bank.

But five months earlier had already been created in Barcelona the first transfusion service designed to collect blood, keeping and carrying to be transfused distance and that was the work of Frederic Duran i Jordà.

The Barcelona Transfusion Service 

At that time in Barcelona were made primarily direct transfusion arm in arm with syringe Jubé. Dr. Ricardo Moragas published in 1935 had been made in the Blood Transfusion Service of the Hospital de Sant Pau in Barcelona, 128 transfusions all directly from family 83 times in 29 donors hospital and 16 donors 'professionals'. Direct transfusions sometimes required the surgical exposure of the arm vein which hindered further donations / transfusions.

At that time only Grífols Dr. José Antonio Roig performed indirect citrated blood transfusions in transfusora flébula that he designed. A glass vessel where the donor's blood was collected in citrate and subsequently infusing the receiver by injecting air into the glass container. Was technically complicated realization and use an outward storage circuitry does not allow more than a few hours due to the risk of bacterial contamination.

When the Civil War broke Dr Duran joins Hospital 18 located on the mountain of Montjuïc to collaborate in the care of the wounded who filled every hospital in the city. There it was observed that sometimes the amount of blood that had to be transfused was greater than could be provided by direct donor transfusion. Also receives a letter from his two companions Wenceslao Dutrem and Serafina Palma, featured on the Aragon front, where bemoan about the lack of blood for the wounded. This letter make him to decide to leave the hospital and with the support of the Medical Service Republican Army to create a service able to provide the necessary blood for transfusion of both military and civilian casualties.

The Transfusion Service was initially located in premises of the Hospital 18 de Montjuïc and a group of collaborators was incorporated, some of which were essential in the development, starting almost from 0, having to develop the special technology and methodology for the new service like Alfred Benlloch Llorach and Enric Margarit Aleu. Feverish activity begins in early August that makes the first batch of seven litres of blood and sent to hospitals on the Aragon front in mid-September. Subsequently, in order to meet the growing demand and facilitate access by donors to the extractions, the Transfusion Service moved to the center of the city, Calle Mallorca 216, between Balmes i Enrique Granados on February 5, 1938.

The service was visited by numerous foreign medical specialist, among them Dr Norman Bethune after his arrival to Spain in November 1936. Dr Bethune develop a similar service in Madrid afterwards.

Dr. Duran also presented the innovations of to many foreign countries, including Czechoslovakia and Britain, including a film in English for that purpose.

The Duran Method 

In the first visit of potential donor, a name, address and medical history was recorded. If there were no grounds for exclusion, extraction where the blood group was determined and the test was performed Wasserman-Bordet was performed for syphilis. If all tests were correct it was reported the following week for extraction. Initially only blood group O was mined, would go into combat and blood group A was reserved for the city hospitals, where transfundiría prior determination of the blood group of the recipient.

The extractions were done fasting, with an interval of three weeks to a month. The amount of blood collected was between 300 and 400 ml, which was mixed with a 10% citrate solution 4%. With the donor lying on a stretcher, venipuncture area (usually the elbow) was cleaned with iodine and alcohol and delimited with sterile drapes. Extraction was performed via a needle in a Duran modified Erlenmeyer flasks 500 mL continuously agitated to promote mixing of blood and anticoagulant, with the help of a vacuum system.

Subsequently, the sterility of the blood contained in the flask was checked by withdrawing a sample was seeded on agar tubes and the supernatant is used to recheck the blood group of the flask. However, errors in blood grouping because, among other things, the quality of the reagents were prepared in the same service, it is advised to perform before transfusion biological test Ochlecker: inject 5-10 ml blood, wait 10–15 minutes and continue transfusion if there had been no symptoms.

If extraction is believed to be correct, the blood of six donors from the same group was mixed in an Erlenmeyer flask of two litres, by passing it through a filter consisting of silk fabric with a pore size of about 250 microns. This is managed to remove clots and aggregates which might have formed during bleeding.

Initially the blood, once mixed, was placed in glass jars shaped ball 300 ml with a rubber stopper through which passed a glass tube. When it was time to use, blood was flowing injecting air into the vial through the rubber stopper with a pear. Thanks to the collaboration of Dr. Cullell of Pujol-Cullell Laboratorios this method was later replaced by a sterile closed glass vessel under pressure with an arc. Tubes were called Rapide, a patent that Dr. Cullell had bought a Madrid engineer. The Rapide system allowed without any transfusor apparatus and only with the needle and filter connected carrying bottles, transfusion be held even in the firing line.

Blood bottles were stored at 2 °C up to 15 days before use is checked that there is a clear interface between the red cell and plasma package and it maintained its yellowing. Bottles with hemolytic supernatant were discarded. If the appearance of the bottle was right, it was heated in a water bath prior to administration to the patient.

Dr. José Vives Mañé, after making over 130 transfusions with Duran method concludes: "Duran method has the advantage of being quick and easy method. The results we have obtained oblige us to be his strongest supporters, because we are convinced that the opposite is irreplaceable ".

A four-ton truck Diamon two generators Mr. Vidal, who was engaged to transport fish from the north, suitably conditioned allowed in late August 1936 for the first time in history transport blood transfusion at a distance of about 300 km. Weekly shipments were made to the front, and trying to keep a stock of 35 litres of blood in each hospital.

During the 30 months worked, the Transfusion Service Barcelona recorded about 28,900 donors, performed more than 20 000 donations, and processed and prepared for transfusion 9 000 litres of blood.

Later Frederic Duran i Jordà fled to Britain in 1938, and worked with Dr Janet Vaughan at the Royal Postgraduate Medical School at Hammersmith Hospital to create a system of national blood banks in London. With the outbreak of war looking imminent in 1938, the War Office created the Army Blood Supply Depot (ABSD) in Bristol headed by Lionel Whitby and in control of four large blood depots around the country. British policy through the war was to supply military personnel with blood from centralized depots, in contrast to the approach taken by the Americans and Germans where troops at the front were bled to provide required blood. The British method proved to be more successful at adequately meeting all requirements and over 700 000 donors were bled over the course of the war. This system evolved into the National Blood Transfusion Service established in 1946, the first national service to be implemented.

Contributions 

Contributions to medicine doctor Duran i Jordà, pioneer of modern blood transfusion service, are admirable; more so if one takes into consideration the circumstances and limitations of the moment.

 The best way to treat the blood was not take from hospital to hospital, but to create a large and stable organization to provide such service. Currently is still committed to centralization.
 He quickly saw that investigations currently betting on blood drawn from corpses, were misguided. It was essential to use living donors. Today volunteer donors.
 Promotion of blood donation. The call for donor appeals made through radio, concerts, etc.
 Duran determined that blood collection should be fasting. Today is not the case: we must have done digestion.
 It also found that among mining and extraction, should spend a period of three weeks currently have to wait 60 days. If you're a woman you can donate 3 times a year and if you are male, 4.
 Filtration of blood, always in closed systems under vacuum to avoid contamination. As today, but more advanced techniques.
 Ignoring for the moment the existence of the Rh groups, the doctor had the brilliant idea of mixing the blood of six donors from the same group to minimize the risks. At present, each patient receives the same blood type.
 Keep cold blood, at a temperature of between 2 and 4 degrees. Still remains so.
 Durán-Jordà ended the transfusion arm to arm and fostered the current autoinjectable.
 Perfected glass container was used to store the blood. Used transparent and neutral glass with two compartments, one at the bottom, with a capacity of 400 cm2 containing blood and other, at the top, ultra filtered air carrying two atmospheres pressure. Nowadays plastic bags, sterilized totally, which serves to store the blood components are used.
 Hinted utility transfusion of blood fractions (plasma, platelets ...)
 The first mobile unit to transport blood was enabled world, a refrigerated truck of a fish dealer. Now, the mobile unit is equipped with trays of butanediol to control the temperature of blood donations.

Corollary 
Frederic Duran i Jordà was a pioneer in the field of hemotherapy since it first created in history a transfusion service in the modern sense. He carried out thanks to its analytical and practical thinking and known for its ability to surround a team that made it possible to create, from almost nothing, the necessary technology. The technology over the years has become obsolete, but the principles and theoretical foundations on which it introduced, such as ensuring the absence of bacterial contamination of blood units continue in full force.

References

Bibliography
 Red Gold Epic History of Blood. Duran-Jorda and Barcelona Blood Transfusion Service. Consultable in https://www.pbs.org/wnet/redgold/history/timeline4.html and https://www.pbs.org/wnet/redgold/basics/ukandspain2.html.
 Broggi Vallès About Frederic M. Duran Jorda. Gimbernat 1997; 27: 185-191
 
 Benlloch Llorach Alfredo Duran Jorda F, "Contribution to the study of the in vitro metabolism of citrated blood preserved. The destruction of complement." Health Magazine 1937 War 344-47
 Duran Jorda Frederic C. Tort the servei I sang transfusion. Gimbernat 1993; 20: 83-90.
 Grífols Espés Frederic J. Duran Jorda: "a method and a time". Editorial Medical Action. Barcelona. 2004.
 
 
 Starr D. Blood: An Epic History of Medicine and Commerce. Alfred A. Knopf. New York. 1998.
 Mañé J. Vives "130 Results obtained in citrated blood transfusions, Duran method". Health Magazine War 1938: 2; 101-5
 
 
 Odyssey Albion

External links 
 
 
 Blood Transfusion in the Front
 
 
  Articles on Nature Journal
 Metges Official College of Barcelona: Catalan Protagonistes of Medicine (in Catalan)
 

Spanish hematologists
1905 births
1957 deaths
Spanish emigrants to the United Kingdom